Dalaba (Pular: 𞤍𞤢𞤤𞤭𞥅𞤪𞤫 𞤁𞤢𞤤𞤢𞤦𞤢𞥄) is a prefecture located in the Mamou Region of Guinea. The capital is Dalaba. The prefecture covers an area of 4,400 km² and has an estimated population of 155,000.

Sub-prefectures
The prefecture is divided administratively into 10 sub-prefectures:
 Dalaba-Centre
 Bodié
 Ditinn
 Kaala
 Kankalabé
 Kébali
 Koba
 Mafara
 Mitty
 Mombéyah

Prefectures of Guinea
Mamou Region